Gruda is a village in Dubrovnik-Neretva County, southern Dalmatia, Croatia. It is on the D8 highway, near the tripoint of Croatia, Bosnia-Herzegovina and Montenegro.

External links
 http://www.gruda.org/

Populated places in Dubrovnik-Neretva County

Konavle